The First Lady is a 2015 Nigerian movie produced and directed by Omoni Oboli.

Plot
A prostitute who is tired of the kind of work she does doing everything in her power to stop and also looking unto a man to save her from her predicament.

Cast
 Omoni Oboli
 Chinedu Ikedieze
 Joseph Benjamin
 Alexx Ekubo
 Yvonne Jegede
 Udoka Oyeka
 Anthony Monjaro

References

External links 

 

English-language Nigerian films
2015 films
2010s English-language films